This is a list of National Historic Landmarks in Boston, Massachusetts.  It includes 57 properties and districts designated as National Historic Landmarks in the city of Boston, Massachusetts, United States. Another 131 National Historic Landmarks are located in the remaining parts of the state of Massachusetts. Boston has more National Historic Landmarks per square mile than any other major city in the US.

Current National Historic Landmarks
The National Historic Landmarks in Boston are spread out over many neighborhoods, from the waterfront to Jamaica Plain.

|}

Historic areas of the NPS in Boston
National Historical Parks, some National Monuments, and certain other areas listed in the National Park system are historic landmarks of national importance that are highly protected already, often before the inauguration of the NHL program in 1960, and are then often not also named NHLs per se.  There are two of these in Boston.  The National Park Service lists these two together with the NHLs in the state,

They are:

See also
List of National Historic Landmarks in Massachusetts
National Register of Historic Places listings in Boston, Massachusetts

References

External links

National
Massachusetts